Fidel Jeobani Chacón Skiner (born 10 February 1980) is a Colombian former professional racing cyclist. He won the Colombian National Road Race Championships in 2007.

Major results
2002
 1st Stage 5 Clásico RCN
 1st Stage 10 Vuelta al Táchira
 1st Prologue & Stage 5 Tour du Sénégal
2003
 1st Stage 2 Vuelta a Guatemala
2005
 1st Clásica Rafael Mora Vidal
 1st Stage 1 Volta a Portugal
 3rd Overall Clásica de Fusagasugá
1st Stage 1
2006
 8th Gran Premio Área Metropolitana de Vigo
2007
 1st  Road race, National Road Championships
2009
 1st Stage 3 Clásico RCN
 1st Prologue Vuelta a Colombia
2010
 1st Clásica Rafael Mora Vidal

References

External links
 
 

1980 births
Living people
Colombian male cyclists
Place of birth missing (living people)
21st-century Colombian people